Ronald D. E. Cannan (born May 8, 1961 in Edmonton, Alberta) is a Canadian politician.

On April 1, 2016 Cannan was appointed as Board Director of The Land Title and Survey Authority of British Columbia (LTSABC).

Cannan was a Canadian Member of Parliament and member of the Conservative Party of Canada. Cannan was elected to the House of Commons of Canada in the 2006 federal election and represented the riding of Kelowna—Lake Country. He sat on Kelowna City Council from 1996 to 2005, and from 2022 to the present.

Cannan was elected as Member of Parliament of Kelowna in 2006, 2008 and 2011.

Family background
Cannan and his wife Cindy (whom he married in 1984 in Edmonton, Alberta) have three adult daughters and grandchildren all living in Kelowna. They moved to Kelowna in 1990.

Career background
Prior to entering politics, Cannan was involved in marketing and advertising sales.

Municipal politics (1996–2005)
Cannan was first elected to Kelowna City Council in the November 1996 civic election for a three-year term. He was re-elected in the next two elections, and served a total of nine years on Kelowna City Council. During this time, he also served as a director for the Central Okanagan Regional District.  Cannan returned to local politics on October 15, 2022 when he topped the polls and was elected to Kelowna City Council. He was then appointed as a Director to the Central Okanagan Regional District and Central Okanagan Regional District Hospital Board.

Federal politics (2006–2015)
Cannan won the Conservative Party nomination in May 2005 for Kelowna-Lake Country and was subsequently elected MP on January 23, 2006, in the 2006 federal election by capturing nearly fifty-percent of the vote. Cannan also was re-elected on October 14, 2008 with over 55% of the share of the votes.

Cannan supported pragmatic climate action policies proposed by his government while in Parliament from 2006 until his defeat in the 2015 election.

In 2015 Cannan was defeated by Liberal challenger Stephen Fuhr. Kelowna—Lake Country and its predecessors had been held by centre-of-right parties since 1972, and a non-conservative challenger had last won more than 30 percent of the vote in 1988. In 2015, however, Fuhr took 46 percent of the vote to Cannan's 39 percent.

He was one of three MPs not in cabinet to serve on the Treasury Board Sub-Committee on Government Administration, and became entitled to the title "Honourable" as a member of the Queen's Privy Council for Canada.

Election results

References

External links 
Ron Cannan

1961 births
Conservative Party of Canada MPs
Kelowna city councillors
Living people
Members of the House of Commons of Canada from British Columbia
Members of the King's Privy Council for Canada
Politicians from Edmonton
21st-century Canadian politicians